La Dolce Viva is a nonfiction novel written by Barbara L. Goldsmith, first published in 1968 in  New York Magazine, about a destroyed one-named actress, Viva, who is drugged out and couldn't pay her phone bill.

Barbara Goldsmith is an American author, journalist, and philanthropist. Her La Dolce Viva made known the sadder side of Andy Warhol’s entourage through Viva, a high on drugs “superstar.”

Summary
La Dolce Viva is an interview story with "superstar" Viva, who is one of the many actresses in Andy Warhol's movies.  Viva was headlined as 'The Last of Andy Warhol's "superstars", as Warhol would film them and declare them "superstars". Along with being an actress, Viva is a model who influences the fashion trends of the time. 

Being in Warhol's inner circle made Viva a good choice for this interview.  Viva grew up in a very Catholic home surrounded by figures of the Virgin Mary, Bibles,  and pictures of First Communion.  At home, religious values were imposed upon Viva from her family.  Viva lived with the nuns until she was twenty years old.  Once Viva turned twenty, she left the religious ways of her family and the Catholic Church and she started to explore what is now her derogatory lifestyle of sleeping around with multiple partners. The book details Viva's experience with sex, drug, and love in Warhol's factory. Along with sleeping with a different guy almost every night, Viva also was turned on to drugs by Timothy Leary. Viva started  doing drugs out of curiosity but quickly became addicted and could not stop.  The environment of Andy Warhol and his inner circle did not help her addiction to these drugs due to the fact that everyone else was using them as well.  Once Viva became tired of drugs and sex, she decided to return home to her parents and asked to be put into a mental institution.  Once viva say the institution, she became scared and begged her mother to take her home.  When Viva returned home, she realized that she missed the lifestyle that she had with Warhol and decided to go back to New York with her sister.  Viva started out back in New York with her sister but that quickly ended when she realized her dependency upon Warhol and she decided to leave her sister and move back into Warhol's inner circle.  Her promiscuous ways and drug use led Viva to become very dependent upon men.  Even though in the interview Viva tries to portray herself as an independent woman, she greatly depends on Andy Warhol to not only help pay her rent and electricity bill but to help her keep up with her lifestyle of drug use and fitting in with the crowd.  Having to have Andy Warhol pay for everything Viva needed clearly shows just how dependent she was on someone else.

Tone
In La Dolce Viva the tone is honest, shocking to some, and nonchalant. Her lifestyle, especially her promiscuity, was not accepted in this period in time. Throughout Goldsmith's representation of tone and mood, it is somewhat negative as they scrimmage through her apartment junk, talk about her rough life, and the need for sex and drugs.

Setting
La Dolce Viva takes place mostly in Warhol's new loft studio which has been named 'The Factory', which was full of his helpers and hangers-on. Some parts of the interview took place in Viva's East 83rd Street brownstone floor-through apartment which is scattered with the mixture of clean and dirty clothes, underwear, dishes in the sink, food on the counter and stacks of old magazines and papers.  Along with Andy Warhol's apartment and Viva's apartment, La Dolce Viva also takes place in Max's Kansas City, a restaurant where the models, actresses, and Warhol were treated like celebrities.

Characterization
Viva's character is introduced to readers as an actress in Andy Warhol's movies and later, readers find out that she is a model who influences the fashion industry.  Goldsmith uses questions that lead to showing Viva's promiscuous side and her dependency on a male figure.  Viva is quoted saying "I slept with him for security reasons" during the interview and Goldsmith included this quote because it showed Viva's constant need for a man.  Her disorganization and unreliability contributed to the end of her modeling aspirations. Describing Viva's messy apartment and how the dust filled your nose as you walked in and you could hardly see through the filthy windows, helps readers see how Viva lived a cluttered and messy lifestyle.  The way that Viva presented herself during the interview with an outfit that did not match and hair that looked unwashed for days showed just how little she cared about her appearance.

Effects and Criticism
La Dolce Viva revealed the seedier side of Andy Warhol's entourage through Viva. “I had never seen anything like it,” Tom Wolfe wrote of accompanying nude photos from Diane Arbus. According to contemporary New York Times review of the book, La Dolce Viva gave an insight to Warhol's relationship to other people. But the articles appearance in the New York hurt the magazine ("The Nude Photos that Nearly Destroyed New York"), and New Yorks editor, Clay Felker, was aware of the commercial risk he ran in publishing the piece. Some reviewers of La Dolce Viva were generally hesitant to read this piece, but then read the entire work.

1968 novels
Biographical novels